Helene Marie Fossesholm (born 31 May 2001) is a Norwegian cross-country skier who competes for Eiker Skiklubb. She has won a total of three gold medals at the FIS Nordic Junior World Ski Championships, and won her first podium in the World Cup, finishing second in Rukatunturi, Finland, in November 2020. Besides skiing she has also competed in mountain bike racing and has a bronze medal from the junior cross-country race at the 2019 UCI Mountain Bike World Championships.

Cross-country skiing results
All results are sourced from the International Ski Federation (FIS).

Olympic Games

World Championships
 1 medal – (1 gold)

World Cup

Season standings

Individual podiums
 2 podiums – (1 , 1 )

Team podiums
 1 victory – (1 ) 
 2 podiums – (2 )

References

External links
 
 
 
 

2001 births
Living people
Norwegian female cross-country skiers
People from Øvre Eiker
FIS Nordic World Ski Championships medalists in cross-country skiing
Cross-country skiers at the 2022 Winter Olympics
Olympic cross-country skiers of Norway
Sportspeople from Viken (county)